BBK may refer to:
 BBK Russian Library-Bibliographical Classification (Bibliotechno-Bibliograficheskaya Klassifikatsiya), a Russian library classification system
 "B.B.K." (song), by the band Korn from their 1998 album Follow the Leader
 BBK DAV College for Women, Amritsar, Punjab, India
 BBK Electronics, a Chinese electronics producer
 Barclays Bank of Kenya, a commercial bank
 Bank of Bahrain and Kuwait, a commercial bank
 Bilbao Bizkaia Kutxa, a Basque-based Spanish bank
 Birkbeck, University of London
 Birkbeck Court, University of Strathclyde
 Blåsuts BK, a bandy club in Sweden
 Boy Better Know, a British grime crew and record label
 Breakbeat Kaos, a British record label
 Brønshøj BK, a Danish football club
 Kasane Airport, Botswana
 White Sea–Baltic Canal (Russian: ,